Gisella Sofio (19 February 1931 – 27 January 2017) was an Italian actress.

Life and career 
Born in Milan, Sofio started her career at the age of 16 as a model. In 1951 she began her acting career in Mario Mattoli's film Accidents to the Taxes!!. Since then she had a prolific career as an actress in theatres, movies, and television, working with directors like Michelangelo Antonioni, Luigi Comencini and Pupi Avati.

Sofio died on 27 January 2017 in Rome at the age of 85.

Partial filmography

 Accidents to the Taxes!! (1951) - Silvia
 The Steamship Owner (1951) - La coreografa
 Il microfono è vostro (1951) - Maria Variani
 Viva il cinema! (1952)
 Hello Elephant (1952) - Fidanzata del maestro
 Er fattaccio (1952)
 The Lady Without Camelias (1953) - Simonetta Rota's Friend
 Cronaca di un delitto (1953) - Sorella di Elena
 Una donna prega (1953) - Silvana
 Sul ponte dei sospiri (1953) - Barberina
 Viva la rivista! (1953)
 Rascel-Fifì (1957) - La signora al telefono
 Angel in a Taxi (1958) - Suor Celeste
 Via col para... vento (1958)
 Caporale di giornata (1958) - Maria
 My Wife's Enemy (1959) - RCA Worker
 Destinazione Sanremo (1959) - Rosetta
 Quel tesoro di papà (1959) - Mafalda
 La cento chilometri (1959) - The Chic Lady in the Bar
 I mafiosi (1959) - Giornalista Snob
 Spavaldi e innamorati (1959) - Serafina
 Perfide.... ma belle (1959) - Luciana
 Femmine di lusso (1960) - Mariella
 A Qualcuna Piace Calvo (1960) - Giovanna
 Rage of the Buccaneers (1961) - Rosita, Manuela's maid
 Lo smemorato di Collegno (1962) - Giornalista Milanese
 L'assassino si chiama Pompeo (1962) - Police Commissioner De Santis' Wife
 Latin Lovers (1965) - Signorina Beata (segment "Il telefono consolatore")
 Vacanze sulla neve (1966)
 La vuole lui... lo vuole lei (1968) - Gisella
 Story of a Woman (1970) - Mrs. Curtis
 La ragazza del prete (1970) - Antonella, la direttrice del collegio
 La liceale (1975) - Elvira, Loredana's Mother
 The School Teacher in the House (1978) - Teresa / Marcello's mother
 L'insegnante al mare con tutta la classe (1980) - Wife of Headmaster
 Voltati Eugenio (1980) - Grandmother Edvige
 Gian Burrasca (1982) - Margherita Stoppani
 Italiani a Rio (1987) - Moglie del commendatore
 Cain vs. Cain (1993) - Giuliana
 Peggio di così si muore (1995) - Anna's mother
 Simpatici & antipatici (1998)
 Cucciolo (1998) - Lucia
 Incontri proibiti (1998) - Nun at hospital
 The Bodyguard's Cure (2006) - Madre di Gorilla
 Fuoco su di me (2006) - Giocatrice
 No Problem (2008) - Signora Pairo
 Torno a vivere da solo (2008) - Giacomo's mother
 Alice (2010) - Nonna di Alice
 Wedding in Paris (2011) - Nonna
 The Worst Week of My Life (2011) - Nonna
 The Big Heart of Girls (2011) - Olimpia Osti
 The Unlikely Prince (2013) - Anziana Contessa
 Il crimine non va in pensione (2017) - Ersilia (final film role)

References

External links 

 

1931 births
2017 deaths
Actresses from Milan
Italian film actresses
Italian television actresses
Italian stage actresses